Utagawa Sadafusa was an ukiyo-e artist from the Edo period.

Sadafusa was a disciple of Utagawa Kunisada, of Utagawa school, his style was similar to his teacher's. A lot of his works are in bijin-e genre (pictures of beautiful women), he also created images of kabuki actors, historical and mythic heroes, acrobats and game board prints. He worked between 1825 and 1850. He was from Edo, but later moved to Osaka and worked there.

Sadafusa also worked as a book illustrator for Iwatoya Kisaburō in 1829-30 and Moriya Jihei 1830-33 and 1835.

Gallery

References

External links 

19th-century Japanese painters
Artists from Tokyo
Japanese engravers
Japanese illustrators
Japanese landscape painters
Utagawa school
Ukiyo-e artists